Year 482 (CDLXXXII) was a common year starting on Friday (link will display the full calendar) of the Julian calendar. At the time, it was known as the Year of the Consulship of Severinus and Illus (or, less frequently, year 1235 Ab urbe condita). The denomination 482 for this year has been used since the early medieval period, when the Anno Domini calendar era became the prevalent method in Europe for naming years.

Events 
 By place 
 Byzantine Empire 
 Emperor Zeno promulgates an Edict of Union (Henotikon), in an unsuccessful effort to soften the decision made at the Council of Chalcedon (451), and resolve differences between the Eastern and Western Churches. Zeno wishes to placate the Monophysite churches of Egypt, Palestine and Syria for political reasons. 

 Eastern Europe 
 Kyiv is founded, on the banks of the Dnieper River.

 China 
 Prince Qi Wudi succeeds his father Qi Gaodi, and becomes emperor of Southern Qi.

Births 
 Justinian I, emperor of the Byzantine Empire (d. 565)

Deaths 
 January 8 – Severinus of Noricum, monk and saint
 Ailill Molt, High King of Ireland (approximate date)
 Qi Gaodi, Chinese emperor of Southern Qi (b. 427)

References